Sérgio Rodrigo Penteado Dias known as Serginho Paulista (born 25 September 1980), is a Brazilian footballer who (as of April 2011) plays for Volta Redonda as a right back.

Biography
Born in Campinas, São Paulo state, Serginho spent most of his career in Brazilian state leagues, especially inside São Paulo state.

In December 2004 he was signed by Olímpia (SP), and in August same year transferred to Independente de Limeira for 2005 Copa Paulista.

In January 2006 he signed a 1-year deal with Alagoas side CRB, but in February returned to Independente, signed until the end of 2006 Campeonato Paulista Série A3.

In December 2006 he signed a 1-year contract with Social Esportiva Vitória of Hortolândia. The team finished 17th in 2007 Campeonato Paulista Série A3.

On 1 June 2007 he extended his contract with SEV to December 2008, and left for Sport Recife of 2007 Campeonato Brasileiro Série A on 4 June.

In the next season he left for Náutico and played 4 games in 2008 Copa do Brasil. He was released again in June without any appearance in 2008 Campeonato Brasileiro Série A; He joined ABC in June but released in August.

He was signed by União Barbarense in January 2009, but left the club after the end of 2009 Campeonato Paulista Série A3. He joined Campinas until the end of 2009 Copa Paulista. In December 2009 he was signed by Campeonato Paulista club Ituano.

He left for Marília in December 2010. At that time Marília released another Serginho Paulista (Sérgio Mendes Coimbra) and signed left back Serginho, thus Sérgio Rodrigo Penteado Dias became Serginho Paulista and the left back became Serginho Pernambucano, using the demonym as disambiguation. However he left the club in February and signed by Volta Redonda until the end of 2011 Campeonato Carioca.

References

External links
 CBF   (old archive)
 

Brazilian footballers
Associação Ferroviária de Esportes players
Rio Branco Esporte Clube players
Clube de Regatas Brasil players
Sport Club do Recife players
Clube Náutico Capibaribe players
ABC Futebol Clube players
União Agrícola Barbarense Futebol Clube players
Ituano FC players
Marília Atlético Clube players
Volta Redonda FC players
Association football fullbacks
Sportspeople from Campinas
1980 births
Living people
Sport Club Barueri players